Elisabeth of Anhalt-Zerbst (15 September 1563 – 8 November 1607) was Electress of Brandenburg by marriage to John George, Elector of Brandenburg.

Early life 
Elizabeth was a daughter of Joachim Ernest, Prince of Anhalt (1536–1585), from his first marriage to Countess Agnes of Barby-Mühlingen (1540–1569).

Biography 
On 6 October 1577 she married John George (1525–1598), in Jagdschloss Letzlingen. Her husband was almost 40 years older than she was.  Elisabeth was his third wife, and was 16 years younger than her stepson Joachim Frederick.  The marriage was celebrated without many festivities, and Elizabeth was promised 400 guilders annually as her dower.  Elizabeth brought as a dowry into the marriage 15 000 thalers and received as jointure, besides a considerable pension, the city of Crossen, including Crossen Palace, plus the district and city of Züllichau and the lordship of Bobrowice.

Elisabeth was a patron of the scholar Leonhard Thurneysser. After her husband's death, weakened by child-bearing, she retired with her younger children to her widow seat of Crossen Palace.  She is buried in the crypt of the Hohenzollerns in the Berliner Dom.

Issue 
Her marriage to John George of Brandenburg produced the following children:
 Christian (30 January 1581 – 30 May 1655)
 Magdalena (7 January 1582 – 4 May 1616), married in 1598 to Louis V, Landgrave of Hesse-Darmstadt
 Joachim Ernest (22 June 1583 – 7 March 1625)
 Agnes (17 July 1584 – 26 March 1629), married:
 in 1604 Duke Philipp Julius of Pomerania;
 in 1628 Duke Francis Charles of Saxe-Lauenburg
 Frederick (22 March 1588 – 19 May 1611)
 Elisabeth Sophia (13 July 1589 – 24 December 1629), married:
 in 1613 to Reichsfürst (Prince) Janusz Radziwiłł;
 in 1628 to Duke Julius Henry of Saxe-Lauenburg
 Dorothea Sibylle (19 October 1590 – 9 March 1625), married in 1610 to Duke John Christian of Brieg
 George Albert (20 November 1591 – 29 November 1615)
 Sigismund (20 November 1592 – 30 April 1640)
 John (13 July 1597 – 23 September 1627), Bishop of Havelberg
 John George (4 August 1598 – 27 January 1637)

References and sources 
 Friederike Bornhak: Elisabeth von Anhalt: Kurfürstin von Brandenburg, dritte Gemahlin des Kurfürsten Johann Georg von Brandenburg, geboren 1563, gestorben 1607, S. Geibel, 1889
 Ernst Daniel Martin Kirchner: Die Kurfürstinnen und Königinnen auf dem Throne der Hohhenzollern, part 2l: Die letzten acht Kurfürstinnen, Berlin, 1867, p. 34 ff. (digitized)

|-

Electresses of Brandenburg
Elisabeth
1563 births
1607 deaths
People from Zerbst
Burials at Berlin Cathedral
Daughters of monarchs